An executioner is an officer of the court who carries out capital punishment sentences.

Executioner may also refer to:
"The Executioner", a painting by 17th-century Spanish Tenebrist painter Jusepe de Ribera

Written works 
The Executioner (book series), a series of novels featuring Mack Bolan
Executioner (comics), a Marvel Comics supervillain
The Executioners (MacDonald novel), a 1957 novel by John D. MacDonald
The Executioners (Killmaster novel), a 1971 novel by Nick Carter
The Executioner (Kisyov novel) a novel by Stefan Kisyov about the killer of Bulgarian dissident writer Georgi Markov

Film and television 
Executioners (film), a 1993 film by Johnny To
The Executioner (1963 film) or El verdugo, a Luis García Berlanga film
The Executioner (1970 film) a film directed by Sam Wanamaker starring George Peppard
The Executioner (1975 film), a 1975 South Korean film
Executioner (1974 film), a 1974 film starring Sonny Chiba
The Executioner, a 1978 film also known as Massacre Mafia Style
"The Executioners", first episode of the 1965 Doctor Who serial The Chase
The Executioner (TV series) a 2015 television drama produced by TVB
"The Executioner" (Gotham), an episode in the third season of Gotham
Permission to Kill, a 1975 film also known as The Executioner

Sports 
The Executioners (professional wrestling), the name of several WWE tag teams
Buddy Rose or The Executioner, American wrestler
Terry Gordy or The Executioner, wrestler
Bernard Hopkins or The Executioner, American boxer

Music
Executioner (album), a 2009 album by Mantic Ritual
Executioner (band), a thrash metal band from Boston
The X-Ecutioners, American turntablist group

See also
Executor (disambiguation)